The Round Britain and Ireland double handed Yacht Race was established in 1966 and is held every four years starting and finishing in Plymouth, England. There are four compulsory stops of forty-eight hours at Kinsale, Barra, Lerwick and Lowestoft.

Following the success of the first two OSTARs, Herbert Hasler proposed to the Royal Western Yacht Club that there should be a two-handed race around the British Isles. The proposal was considered and the first Round Britain and Ireland race was held in 1966. It would circumnavigate Britain and Ireland and, with the exception of the Channel Islands and Rockall, all islands and rocks would be left to starboard.

The first race was a great success and the RB&I was established on a four year cycle (two years off the OSTAR cycle). Lowestoft replaced Harwich as the east coast port from the second race on. Thereafter the course remained the same until Kinsale replaced Crosshaven in 2006.

The RB&I grew rapidly to a multinational entry of many boat sizes and types. In 1982 the 85 starters included an 80 ft monohull, a 70 ft catamaran, several 60 and 65 ft trimarans, down to a 25 ft monohull, and represented over a dozen nationalities.

The following race was held in 1985, since 1986 was given over to the second TwoSTAR so it could run two years apart from the OSTAR. The four year cycle continued with races in 1989 and 1993, but reverted (following the last TwoSTAR in 1994) to its original schedule in 1998 and on to the latest race in 2018.

References

External links
 RWYC RB&I home page
 Yellowbrick live race tracking
 Competitors from Cornwall and Shetland both extreme opposite ends of the UK
 Well-known British entrant on a Class 40

Sailing competitions in the United Kingdom
Sailing in the United Kingdom
Yachting races
1966 establishments in the United Kingdom
Recurring sporting events established in 1966